Narraga is a genus of moths in the family Geometridae.

Species
Narraga cappadocica Herbulot, 1943
Narraga fasciolaria (Hufnagel, 1767)
Narraga fimetaria (Grote & Robinson, 1870)
Narraga georgiana Covell, 1984
Narraga isabel Agenjo, 1956
Narraga nelvae (Rothschild, 1912)
Narraga stalachtaria (Strecker, 1878)
Narraga tessularia (Metzner, 1845)

References

External links

Macariini